The Best of Christmas is a Christmas-themed compilation album released by the group Celtic Woman, and their seventh under that category overall.

Performers on The Best of Christmas are vocalists Chloë Agnew, Mairéad Carlin, Órla Fallon, Lisa Kelly, Lisa Lambe, Susan McFadden, Éabha McMahon, Méav Ní Mhaolchatha, and violinists Máiréad Nesbitt and Tara McNeill.

Track listing 

Notes
Tracks 1, 2, 5, 6, 7, 11, 12, 14, 17, and 18 were originally released on the album A Christmas Celebration.
Track 16 was released on the album Lullaby as an edited version of the original track from the original Celtic Woman album.
Tracks 4, 8, 9, 15, 19, and 20 were originally released on the album Home for Christmas.
Tracks 3, 10, and 13 were originally released on the album Voices of Angels; however, they were not available on the digital release of said album.
Tracks 1-2, 4-9, 11-12, and 14-20 were produced by David Downes.
Tracks 3, 10, and 13 were produced by Gavin Murphy.

Charts

References

2017 compilation albums
Celtic Woman albums
Manhattan Records albums